Planorbidella depressa is a species of sea snail, a marine gastropod mollusk in the family Neomphalidae.

Description

The shell can grow to be 1.6 mm in length.

Distribution
Planorbidella depressa can be found in the Lau Basin.

References

 Warén, A. & Bouchet, P. (1993). New records, species, genera, and a new family of gastropods from hydrothermal vents and hydrocarbon seeps. Zoologica Scripta. 22: 1-90.

External links
 Warén A. & Bouchet P. (2001). Gastropoda and Monoplacophora from hydrothermal vents and seeps new taxa and records. The Veliger, 44(2): 116-231,

Neomphalidae
Gastropods described in 1993